Kepler-26 is a star in the northern constellation of Lyra. It is located at the celestial coordinates: 
Right Ascension  Declination . With an apparent visual magnitude of 15.5, this star is too faint to be seen with the naked eye.

Planetary system
The two planets, Kepler-26b and Kepler-26c, were discovered by transit method in late 2011, and classified as small (sub-Neptune) gas giants in 2016. In 2012, the planetary candidate Kepler-26d was also detected, and confirmed in 2014. The planet Kepler-26e was discovered on a much wider orbit in 2014.

References

 
Lyra (constellation)
M-type main-sequence stars
250
Planetary transit variables
Planetary systems with four confirmed planets
J18594583+4633595